Noijin Kangsang (also Norin Kang or Noijinkangsang) is the highest peak of Lhagoi Kangri mountain range in the Tibet Autonomous Region in China. It lies between the Yarlung Tsangpo River (to the north), Yamdrok Lake (to the east) and the Himalayas mountain range (to the south).

Noijin Kangsang was first climbed via the South Face and Southwest Ridge on 28 April 1986 by a Chinese expedition.

See also
List of Ultras of the Himalayas

References

External links
Noijin Kangsang on Summitpost
Peaklist's list of Eastern Himalayan ultras

Mountains of Tibet
Seven-thousanders of the Himalayas